Mydas is a genus of large flies in the family Mydidae.

Species

 Mydas annularis Gerstaecker, 1868
 Mydas argyrostomus Gerstaecker, 1868
 Mydas arizonensis Wilcox et al., 1989
 Mydas atratus Macquart, 1838
 Mydas audax Osten Sacken, 1874
 Mydas belus (Seguy, 1928)
 Mydas bitaeniatus Bellardi, 1861
 Mydas boonei Curran, 1953
 Mydas brunneus Johnson, 1926
 Mydas cingulatus Williston, 1898
 Mydas claripennis Williston, 1898
 Mydas clavatus (Drury, 1773) (clubbed mydas fly)
 Mydas cleptes Osten Sacken, 1886
 Mydas davidsoni Wilcox et al., 1989
 Mydas eupolis Seguy, 1928
 Mydas evansi Welch and Kondratieff, 1990
 Mydas evansorum Welch, 1991
 Mydas fisheri Wilcox et al., 1989
 Mydas floridensis Wilcox et al., 1989
 Mydas fulvifrons (Illiger, 1801)
 Mydas hardyi Wilcox, Papavero & Pimentel, 1989
 Mydas interruptus Wiedemann, 1830
 Mydas jaliscos Wilcox et al., 1989
 Mydas lavatus Gerstaecker, 1868
 Mydas luteipennis (Loew, 1866)
 Mydas maculiventris (Westwood, 1835)
 Mydas militaris Gerstacker, 1868
 Mydas oaxacensis Wilcox, Papavero & Pimentel, 1989
 Mydas quadrilineatus Williston, 1898
 Mydas rubidapex (Wiedemann, 1831)
 Mydas sarpedon Seguy, 1928
 Mydas sculleni Wilcox, Papavero & Pimentel, 1989
 Mydas subinterruptus Bellardi, 1861
 Mydas testaceiventris Macquart, 1850
 Mydas texanus Wilcox et al., 1989
 Mydas tibialis (Wiedemann, 1831) (golden legged mydas fly)
 Mydas tricinctus Bellardi, 1861
 Mydas ventralis (Gerstacker, 1868)
 Mydas weemsi Wilcox et al., 1989
 Mydas xanthopterus (Loew, 1866)

References

Further reading

External links

 

Mydidae
Articles created by Qbugbot
Asiloidea genera